Florian Trimpl (born 9 July 1979) is a German strongman competitor and entrant to the World's Strongest Man competition on multiple occasions.

Biography
Florian Trimpl began competing in strongman tournaments in 2004 at the age of 24. Trimpl rose to international attention with podium finishes in Germany's Strongest Man, culminating in winning that title in 2009. He did not affiliate to the IFSA but instead participated in the World Strongman Cup tours from 2005 onwards. This international exposure led to a 2007 invitation to the prestigious World's Strongest Man. His win in the qualifying heats of that tournament in the Hercules Hold event, in a group containing Mark Felix who has a claim to having the strongest grip in the world, is the achievement he has stated he is most proud of.' He went on to participate in two more World's Strongest Man finals in 2008 and 2009.

Strongman competition record 
 2005
 10. – World Strongman Cup 2005: Nuremberg
 2006
 2. – Germany's Strongest Man
 9. – World Strongman Cup 2006: Wiedeń
 10. – World Strongman Cup 2006: Podolsk
 2007
 11. – World Strongman Cup 2007: Ryga
 5. – World Strongman Cup 2007: Moskwa
 11. – World Strongman Cup 2007: Dartford
 2. – Germany's Strongest Man
 2008
 competitor World strongest man Malta 
 4. – Germany's Strongest Man
 9. – WSM Super Series 2008: Lysekil
 2009
 1. – Germany's Strongest Man
 9. – Europe's Strongest Man
 1.platz deutschlandcup/Riedenburg 3. Platz Truck pull/ingolstadt 4.platz deutschlandcup/Lüchow 3.platz internationaler strongmancup obertrum Österreich 1.platz deutschlandcup/Waging finale Teilnehmer World strongest man/Charlotte USA 2010 3.platz deutschlandcup/riedenburg 3.platz internationale süddeutsche strongman Meisterschaft/Bad Birnbach 3.platz internationaler Stockerpoint Cup 2.platz deutschlandcup/freital 4.platz deutsche Meisterschaft/waging am See

References

External links
 Florian Trimpl on gfsa-strongman.de

1979 births
Living people
German strength athletes